Luan Zhili (born 6 January 1973) is a female discus thrower from PR China. She finished ninth at the 1997 World Championships and won the 1998 Asian Games, the latter in a personal best throw of 63.43 metres. The Chinese, and Asian, record is currently held by Xiao Yanling with 71.68 metres.

Achievements

References

External links

1973 births
Living people
Chinese female discus throwers
Asian Games medalists in athletics (track and field)
Athletes (track and field) at the 1998 Asian Games
Asian Games gold medalists for China
Medalists at the 1998 Asian Games
20th-century Chinese women